Lyubomyr Halchuk (born 18 September 1981) is a Ukrainian former footballer who played as a defender.

Career

Ukraine 
Halchuk began playing at the local youth level where he ultimately signed with FC Volyn Lutsk in the Ukrainian First League in 2001. In his debut season with Volyn, he helped the club secure promotion to the Ukrainian Premier League by winning the league title. Throughout his tenure in Volyn spent the majority of his time with the Lutsk junior team FC Kovel-Volyn Kovel and with a loan spell with FC Polissya Zhytomyr. He still managed did make several appearances in the Ukrainian top tier throughout his four-year stint.  

In 2005, he returned to the Ukrainian second trier to sign with FC Hazovyk-Skala Stryi. After a season with Hazovyk, he signed with league rivals FC Lviv the following year. Halchuk returned to the country's premier league when he assisted Lviv in securing promotion following the conclusion of the 2007-08 season. He made 16 appearances with Lviv during his second stint in the top trier. In one notable match on 16 August 2008, against rivals Vorskla Poltava, he was named by UA-Football as one of the two best central defenders of the fifth round in the Ukrainian Premier League. Unfortunately, the club's run in the premier league was short-lived as they were relegated to the First League.  

After five seasons with Lviv, he remained in the second tier by signing with Helios Kharkiv. He re-signed with Helios for the 2011-12 season. In 2013, he signed with league rivals Tytan Armyansk. After appearing in 17 matches he left Tytan after the conclusion of the season. Following his departure from Tytan, he spent some time at the amateur level. He returned to the professional level in 2015 by signing with NK Veres Rivne in the Ukrainian Second League. He departed from Veres after the season to pursue a career in Canada.

Canada 
In 2016, he went abroad to sign with FC Ukraine United of the Canadian Soccer League. In his debut season in Canada, he assisted the club in securing a postseason berth by finishing second in the First Division. He also served as vice-captain and helped the club reach the second round of the playoffs.   

The following season he played with league rivals FC Vorkuta and won the First Division title with the club. In his second season with Vorkuta, he assisted in securing the CSL Championship where he recorded a goal against Scarborough SC. In 2020, he assisted in securing Vorkuta's second CSL Championship after defeating Scarborough SC. In 2021, he assisted in securing Vorkuta's third regular season title and secured the ProSound Cup against Scarborough. He also played in the 2021 playoffs where Vorkuta was defeated by Scarborough in the championship final.

Honors 
FC Vorkuta

 CSL Championship: 2018, 2020
 Canadian Soccer League First Division/Regular Season: 2017, 2019, 2021 
ProSound Cup: 2021

References

External links
Profile on Official FC Lviv Website
Profile on EUFO
Profile on Football Squads

1981 births
Living people
People from Nadvirna
Ukrainian footballers
FC Beskyd Nadvirna players
FC Polissya Zhytomyr players
FC Lviv players
FC Volyn Lutsk players
FC Kovel-Volyn Kovel players
FC Ikva Mlyniv players
FC Hazovyk-Skala Stryi players
FC Helios Kharkiv players
FC Tytan Armyansk players
FC Mykolaiv players
NK Veres Rivne players
FC Ukraine United players
FC Continentals players
Ukrainian Premier League players
Canadian Soccer League (1998–present) players
Association football defenders
Ukrainian First League players
Ukrainian expatriate footballers
Ukrainian expatriate sportspeople in Canada
Expatriate soccer players in Canada
Sportspeople from Ivano-Frankivsk Oblast